Cerdas Airport is a high elevation airport serving the village of Cerdas in the Potosí Department of Bolivia.

See also

Transport in Bolivia
List of airports in Bolivia

References

External links 
OpenStreetMap - Cerdas
OurAirports - Cerdas
Fallingrain - Cerdas Airport

Airports in Potosí Department